Stanley Twardowicz (July 8, 1917 – June 12, 2008) was an American abstract painter and photographer.  Twardowicz was born in Detroit, and studied at the Meinzinger Art School during World War II as well as working in a tank factory.

Twardowicz began practicing photography on a 1948 trip to Mexico, and during the 1950s and 1960s he developed his painting style, related to color field paintings and abstract expressionism.  He achieved some national recognition during the years he moved to Plainfield, New Jersey and became a regular at the famous Cedar Tavern in Greenwich Village, the meeting place of fellow abstract expressionists Jackson Pollock, Franz Kline and others.

Stanley Twardowicz was married to Ann Twardowicz (1929–1973), also a well-known painter. In 1971 he married artist Lillian Dodson. Twardowicz also befriended Jack Kerouac, and published some of the only images of the writer in his final years.

Sources 
 Press release after death

1917 births
2008 deaths
20th-century American painters
American male painters
21st-century American painters
21st-century American male artists
Abstract expressionist artists
20th-century American male artists